Molopsida is a genus of beetles in the family Carabidae, endemic to New Zealand. This genus was first described by Adam White (zoologist) in 1846. Molopsida includes the following six species:

 Molopsida antarctica (Castelnau, 1867)
 Molopsida cordipennis (Broun, 1912)
 Molopsida lindrothi Larochelle & Larivière, 2013
 Molopsida polita White, 1846
 Molopsida seriatoporus (Bates, 1874)
 Molopsida strenua (Broun, 1894)

References

Psydrinae
Beetles of New Zealand
Endemic fauna of New Zealand
Endemic insects of New Zealand